Codex Rehdigerianus designated by l or by 11 (in Besauron numbering), is a medieval Latin manuscript written on parchment, which was held in the city library of Breslau. The manuscript is attributed to Cassiodorus II of St. Elisabeth's Church, Breslau. The Codex was named after Thomas Rehdiger, an antiquary from Śląsko, who was the patron of Vulcanius. The manuscript was edited and published in 1913. Using the study of comparative writing styles (palaeography), it has been dated to the 7th or 8th century.

It contains the Vetus Latina text of the four Gospels contaminated by Vulgate readings, with several gaps in John 16:13-21:25.

The words "Oice nos..." and following sentences are very similar to the Lord's Prayer in Slavic languages.

In Matthew 27:9 it has unique variant ἐπληρώθη τὸ ῥηθὲν διὰ Ἰησαίου τοῦ προφήτου (fulfilled what was spoken by Isaiah the prophet). This variant is supported only by Greek Minuscule 21. Another manuscripts have "Jeremiah" or omit name of prophet.

See also 

 List of New Testament Latin manuscripts
 Würzburg Universitätsbibliothek Cod. M. p. th. f. 67

Literature 

 L'Orose de Wrocław (Rehdigeranus 107).
 Rec. M.-P. Lindt, L’Orose de Wrocław (Rehdigerianus 107): sa composition et sa place dans la traduction manuscrite des „Histoires” d’Orose, Eos, 1996, s. 425-428
 Codex Rehdigeranus: Die vier Evangelien nach der lateinischen Handschrift, R 169 der Stadtbibliothek Breslau. Vol. II by H. J. Vogels The Biblical World, Vol. 43, No. 1 (Jan., 1914), pp. 63–64
 Vogels H. J., Codex Rehdigeranus (Collectanea Biblica Latina, II; Rome 1913).

References

External links 
 Codex Rehdigeranus, overview and full reproduction of the codex.

8th-century biblical manuscripts
Vetus Latina New Testament manuscripts